Charles Arthur Woods (5 August 1929 – 7 October 2015) was a New Zealand rugby union player. A hooker, Woods represented Southland at a provincial level. He was a member of the New Zealand national side, the All Blacks, on their tour of Britain, Ireland, France and North American in 1953–54.  On that tour he played 14 matches, but did not appear in any internationals.

References

1929 births
2015 deaths
People from Winton, New Zealand
New Zealand rugby union players
New Zealand international rugby union players
Southland rugby union players
Rugby union hookers
Rugby union players from Southland, New Zealand
People educated at Central Southland College